Grimstad is a municipality in Agder county, Norway. It belongs to the geographical region of Sørlandet. The administrative center of the municipality is the town of Grimstad. Some of the villages in Grimstad include Eide, Espenes, Fevik, Fjære, Håbbestad, Hesnes, Homborsund, Jortveit, Kroken, Landvik, Nygrenda, Prestegårdskogen, Reddal, Roresand, Rønnes, Skiftenes, Tjore, Vik, and Østerhus.

The municipality is centered around the little maritime town of Grimstad which is surrounded by many small islands (Skjærgård). There is a harbor, a main street, a small market square, Grimstad Church, and a museum dedicated to the early life of Henrik Ibsen, who served as an apprentice to Grimstad's local pharmacist Reimann, from 1844 to 1847, before leaving Grimstad in 1850. Ibsen's intimate knowledge of the local people and surroundings can be seen in his poem Terje Vigen.  The majority of the inhabitants live in and around the town, while the rest of the municipality is rural and heavily forested.

The  municipality is the 264th largest by area out of the 356 municipalities in Norway. Grimstad is the 51st most populous municipality in Norway with a population of 24,017.

General information

The town of Grimstad was established as a municipality on 1 January 1838 (see formannskapsdistrikt law). On 1 January 1878, part of the neighboring municipality of Fjære (population: 948) was transferred to Grimstad. Again, on 1 January 1960, another part of Fjære (pop: 344) was transferred to Grimstad. On 1 January 1971, the rural municipalities of Fjære (pop: 6,189) and Landvik (pop: 2,781) were merged with the town of Grimstad (pop: 2,794) to form a significantly larger municipality of Grimstad with a total population of 11,764 at the time of the merger.

Name
The city's name was originally Grømstad, when Norway belonged to the Danish kingdom. The name was misunderstood and became Grimstad during the registration of Norwegian cities and small places. The site of the town was originally the port of the old Grøm farm. The exact meaning of the name Grøm is uncertain, but it is derived from a river name Gró or Gróa which means "the growing one".

Coat of arms
The coat of arms was granted in 1899 and was based upon a seal of the city dating back to 1847. The blue and yellow arms show a brig as a symbol for the importance of fishing and shipping to the city.

Churches
The Church of Norway has four parishes within the municipality of Grimstad. It is part of the Vest-Nedenes prosti (deanery) in the Diocese of Agder og Telemark.

History
Grimstad lies within the boundaries of the ancient parish of Fjære. It is reportedly first mentioned as a harbor in the 16th century. Eight years after he was deposed, Christian II of Denmark–Norway (1513–1523) attempted to recover his kingdoms. A tempest scattered his fleet off the Norwegian coast, and on 24 October 1531, they took refuge at Grimstad. On 1 July 1532, he surrendered to his rival, King Frederick I of Denmark, in exchange for a promise of safe conduct. King Frederick failed to honor his promise and imprisoned Christian until he died.

An inn is recorded at Grimstad as early as 1607. In 1622, Grimstad became a recognized harbor under the town of Arendal. By 1747, Grimstad was identified as a sailing community and a recognized haunt of smugglers. During the Napoleonic Wars, England blockaded Norway. In 1811, an English brig entered the harbor to capture blockade runners, but was vigorously repulsed and did not return.

John Frederik Classen, who owned the Frolands Værk (an ironworks), obtained concessions to export and import through Grimstad and bypass Arendal with its customs dues. Grimstad was awarded market town status in 1816.

The Nørholm farm in Grimstad was the home of Knut Hamsun in the early 20th century.

Government
All municipalities in Norway, including Grimstad, are responsible for primary education (through 10th grade), outpatient health services, senior citizen services, unemployment and other social services, zoning, economic development, and municipal roads. The municipality is governed by a municipal council of elected representatives, which in turn elect a mayor.  The municipality falls under the Agder District Court and the Agder Court of Appeal.

Municipal council
The municipal council of Grimstad is made up of 35 representatives that are elected to four year terms. Currently, the party breakdown is as follows:

Education
Grimstad is home to Drottningborg, a private Lutheran boarding preparatory school. It is also the location of the Bibelskolen in Grimstad (BiG), a private Lutheran bible school. The University of Agder has its faculty of engineering seated here. A student dorm called "Grøm" is also in Grimstad.

Geography
Grimstad is a coastal municipality in Agder county bordering on the Skagerrak. The municipality is bordered by Arendal in the east, Froland and Birkenes in the north, and Lillesand in the west. The lakes Syndle and Rore are found in the northern part of the municipality. Landviksvannet and Reddalsvannet lakes are found in the southern part of the municipality, near Reddal. The rivers Nidelva and Tovdalselva run through parts of the municipality. The Rivingen Lighthouse and Homborsund Lighthouse both sit on small islands just off the coast.

Climate
Grimstad has a temperate oceanic climate (Cfb, marine west coast), with autumn and early winter as the wettest season and Apil - July as the driest season. The all-time high temperature  was 11 August 1975; the all-time low is  recorded 8 February 1966. The March record high  recorded 27 March 2012 was new national heat record for March. Most of the record lows are old; 8 of 12 record lows from before 1970 (November 2021). In recent times, snow usually melts fast along the coast, but the right weather setup can sometimes give large snowfalls.

Attractions
The Maritime Museum, the comprehensive City Museum and the Norwegian Horticultural Museum, are all popular among tourists, as are the wealth of exhibitions and concerts that the town hosts. The town is also a popular destination for summer vacationers, and supports a robust shopping milieu during the Christmas season.
 
During summer, Grimstad plays host to the Norwegian Short Film Festival, which attracts film enthusiasts from far and near. Another popular attraction is the Agder Teater at Fjæreheia, an open-air stage located in a disused stone quarry.
Shopping is also available in Oddensenteret along the harbour. (The view from Oddensenteret is seen in the panorama photo above.)

The Homborsund lighthouse is located within the municipality. Grimstad is also home to the Nøgne Ø brewery.

Sports
The 1997 World Orienteering Championships were held in Grimstad.
The FK Jerv is the most important football club, and plays for first time at the top division in 2022.

Notable residents

The Arts 
 Henrik Ibsen (1828–1906), playwright, wrote his first drama, Catalina in Grimstad in 1848/49
 Andreas Isachsen (1829-1903) a Norwegian actor and playwright
 Knut Hamsun (1859–1952) Nobel lauriate author, lived in Norholm from 1918
 Clara Thue Ebbell (1880–1971) a Norwegian author of young adult fiction
 Roald Dahl (1916–1990), author, visited his grandparents and summered at the Strand Hotel in Fevik in Grimstad
 Lillian Müller (born 1951) a Norwegian model and actress 
 Even Benestad (born 1974) a Norwegian documentary film director 
 Kjetil Mørland (born 1980), singer, songwriter, competed in the Eurovision Song Contest 2015

Public service & public thinking 

 Bent Salvesen (1787-1820) ship's captain, lieutenant in the Royal Danish Navy and privateer
 Elisabeth Helmer (1854–after 1912) a professional photographer and women's rights activist
 Sverre Hassel (1876–1928), polar explorer, accompanied Roald Amundsen to the South Pole
 Marius Nygaard Smith-Petersen (1886–1953) an American physician and orthopaedic surgeon
 Tryggve Gran (1889–1980), polar explorer, flight pioneer and author
 Christopher Grigson (1926-2001) developer of the scanning electron microscope 
 Thor Tjøntveit (1936–2017) a Norwegian-American aviator and convicted fraudster
 Esben Esther Pirelli Benestad (born 1949) a physician, sexologist and prominent trans person
 Gunhild Vehusheia (born 1975) a Norwegian lawyer and women's rights leader

Sport 

 Jacob Gundersen (1875–1968) a Norwegian-American freestyle wrestler, silver medallist (for Norway) at the 1908 Summer Olympics 
 Dag Otto Lauritzen (born 1956), road bicycle racer, bronze medallist at the 1984 Summer Olympics and the first Norwegian to win a stage in the Tour de France in 1987
Thor Hushovd (born 1978), road bicycle racer; 2010 World Road Race Champion; the first Norwegian to wear the yellow jersey and win the green jersey in the Tour de France

Twin towns – sister cities

Grimstad is twinned with:
 Asikkala, Finland
 Billund, Denmark
 Köping, Sweden

References

External links

Municipal fact sheet from Statistics Norway 
 
 Visit Grimstad (Tourist Information) 
 Map of Aust-Agder including Grimstad municipality  
 Agder Theatre at Fjæreheia 
 Norway's Short Film Festival 

 
Municipalities of Agder
1838 establishments in Norway